The following list contains the members, parties, states of origin or representation, and constituencies of all the members of Nigeria's 8th House of Representatives as of the 2015 general election.

References

Government of Nigeria